First-seeded Tony Trabert defeated Sven Davidson 2–6, 6–1, 6–4, 6–2 in the final to win the men's singles tennis title at the 1955 French Championships.

Seeds
The seeded players are listed below. Tony Trabert is the champion; others show the round in which they were eliminated.

  Tony Trabert (champion)
  Vic Seixas (quarterfinals)
  Budge Patty (quarterfinals)
  Ham Richardson (semifinals)
  Art Larsen (fourth round)
  Enrique Morea (fourth round)
  Giuseppe Merlo (semifinals)
  Mervyn Rose (quarterfinals)
  Wladyslaw Skonecki (fourth round)
  Philippe Washer (fourth round)
  Sven Davidson (final)
  Herbert Flam (quarterfinals)
  Paul Remy (fourth round)
  Jacques Brichant (fourth round)
  Kurt Nielsen (fourth round)
  Luis Ayala (fourth round)

Draw

Key
 Q = Qualifier
 WC = Wild card
 LL = Lucky loser
 r = Retired

Finals

Earlier rounds

Section 1

Section 2

Section 3

Section 4

Section 5

Section 6

Section 7

Section 8

External links
   on the French Open website

1955
1955 in French tennis